Demirdöven (Turkish: "iron beater", i.e., blacksmith) may refer to the following places in Turkey:

 Demirdöven, Posof, a village in the district of Posof, Ardahan Province
 Demirdöven, Pasinler
 Demirdöven, Yusufeli, a village in the district of Yusufeli, Artvin Province
 Demirdöven Dam

See also
 Demirci (disambiguation)